Museo ItaloAmericano, also known as the Italian American Museum, is a museum in San Francisco, California, that focuses on Italian-American history, art and culture.

History 
The nonprofit museum was founded by Giuliana Nardelli Haight on August 17, 1978, above Caffe Malvina in North Beach. The first exhibition at the museum was paintings by Paolo Emilio Bergamaschi, alongside sculptures by Beniamino Bufano, Elio Benvenuto, and Peter Macchiarini. The museum was briefly was located on 678 Green Street in North Beach in the 1970s, before it moved again in 1985, to the Fort Mason Center. 

Although the museum always holds temporary exhibits, it also maintains a permanent collection, including works by Beniamino Bufano, Francesco Clemente, Sandro Chia, Mimmo Paladino, among others. The museum also offers a number of Italian language classes, from beginner to advanced to casual conversation classes.

See also

San Francisco

References

External links

Official Site
Article on Italian Jewish Show

Museums in San Francisco
Art museums and galleries in California
Ethnic museums in California
Museo Italoamericano
Italian-American museums
Art museums established in 1978
Museo Italoamericano